June 23 - Eastern Orthodox Church calendar - June 25

All fixed commemorations below celebrated on July 7 by Orthodox Churches on the Old Calendar.

For June 24th, Orthodox Churches on the Old Calendar commemorate the Saints listed on June 11.

Saints
 Nativity of St. John the Baptist and Forerunner.
 Martyrs Orentius, Pharnacius, Eros, Firmus, Firminus, Cyriacus, and Longinus, near Lazica (4th century)
 Saint Nicetas of Remesiana, Bishop of Remesiana (Bela Palanka) (c. 414 or 420)

Pre-Schism Western saints
 Saints Faustus and Companions, 24 martyrs in Rome.
 Saint Simplicius of Autun, a married man who lived a virginal life with his wife and became Bishop of Autun (c. 360)
 Saints Agoard, Agilbert and Companions, holy martyrs in Créteil, now a suburb of Paris in France (5th century)
 Venerable Germocus, born in Ireland, he was the brother of St Breaca and settled near Mount's Bay in Cornwall (6th century)
 Saint Alena of Brussels, martyred at Forest, Belgium (c. 640)
 Saint Rumbold of Mechelen (Rumoldus), a monk who became a bishop with St Willibrord in Holland and in Brabant in Belgium, murdered near Malines (c. 775)
 Saint Theodulphus (Thiou), third Abbot of Lobbes Abbey in Belgium (776)
 Venerable John the Hermit (Ivan), of Bohemia (845 or 904)
 Saint Henry (Heric), born in Hery in Yonne in France, he became a monk at the Abbey of Saint-Germain d'Auxerre (c. 880)
 Saint John of Tuy, born in Galicia in Spain, he lived as a hermit near Tuy, where his relics are still enshrined (9th century)

Post-Schism Orthodox saints
 Venerable Anthony of Dymsk, founder of Dymsk Monastery in Novgorod (1224)
 Saint Mikhail of Tver, Great Prince of Tver (1318)
 Saint John of Yaransk, monk at Solovki (1561)
 Righteous Youths John and James, of Meniugi in Novgorod (1566-1569)
 Saint Athanasius of Paros (1813)
 Saint Gerasimus (Dobroserdov), Bishop of Astrakhan and Enotaeva (1880)

New martyrs and confessors
 New Martyr Panagiotes of Caesarea in Cappadocia, at Constantinople (1765)

Other commemorations
 Synaxis of the Righteous Zechariah and Elizabeth, parents of John the Forerunner.  (see also: September 5)
 Translation of the relics (1492) of Great-martyr John the New to Suceava, Romania (1330-1340)  (see also: June 2 )

Icon gallery

Notes

References

Sources
 June 24/July 7. Orthodox Calendar (PRAVOSLAVIE.RU).
 July 7 / June 24. HOLY TRINITY RUSSIAN ORTHODOX CHURCH (A parish of the Patriarchate of Moscow).
 June 24. OCA - The Lives of the Saints.
 The Autonomous Orthodox Metropolia of Western Europe and the Americas (ROCOR). St. Hilarion Calendar of Saints for the year of our Lord 2004. St. Hilarion Press (Austin, TX). pp. 46–47.
 The Twenty-Fourth Day of the Month of June. Orthodoxy in China.
 June 24. Latin Saints of the Orthodox Patriarchate of Rome.
 The Roman Martyrology. Transl. by the Archbishop of Baltimore. Last Edition, According to the Copy Printed at Rome in 1914. Revised Edition, with the Imprimatur of His Eminence Cardinal Gibbons. Baltimore: John Murphy Company, 1916. pp. 183–184.
 Rev. Richard Stanton. A Menology of England and Wales, or, Brief Memorials of the Ancient British and English Saints Arranged According to the Calendar, Together with the Martyrs of the 16th and 17th Centuries. London: Burns & Oates, 1892. pp. 287–288.
Greek Sources
 Great Synaxaristes:  24 ΙΟΥΝΙΟΥ. ΜΕΓΑΣ ΣΥΝΑΞΑΡΙΣΤΗΣ.
  Συναξαριστής. 24 Ιουνίου. ECCLESIA.GR. (H ΕΚΚΛΗΣΙΑ ΤΗΣ ΕΛΛΑΔΟΣ). 
  24 Ιουνίου. Αποστολική Διακονία της Εκκλησίας της Ελλάδος (Apostoliki Diakonia of the Church of Greece).
  24/06/2018. Ορθόδοξος Συναξαριστής. 
Russian Sources
  7 июля (24 июня). Православная Энциклопедия под редакцией Патриарха Московского и всея Руси Кирилла (электронная версия). (Orthodox Encyclopedia - Pravenc.ru).
  24 июня по старому стилю / 7 июля по новому стилю. Русская Православная Церковь - Православный церковный календарь на 2017 год.
  24 июня (ст.ст.) 7 июля 2014 (нов. ст.). Русская Православная Церковь Отдел внешних церковных связей. (DECR).

June in the Eastern Orthodox calendar